1,2,3-Trichloropropane (TCP) is an organic compound with the formula CHCl(CH2Cl)2.  It is a colorless liquid that is used as a solvent and in other specialty applications.

Production 
1,2,3-Trichloropropane is produced by the addition of chlorine to allyl chloride. TCP also may be produced as a by-product also is produced in significant quantities as an unwanted by-product of the production of other chlorinated compounds such as epichlorohydrin and dichloropropene.

Uses 
Historically, TCP has been used as a paint or varnish remover, a cleaning and degreasing agent, and a solvent. It is also used as an intermediate in the production of hexafluoropropylene.  It is a crosslinking agent for polysulfide polymers and sealants.

Effects of exposure 
Humans can be exposed to TCP by inhaling its fumes or through skin contact and ingestion. TCP is recognized in California as a human carcinogen, and extensive animal studies have shown that it causes cancer. Short term exposure to TCP can cause throat and eye irritation and can affect muscle coordination and concentration. Long term exposure can affect body weight and kidney function.

Regulation

United States

Proposed federal regulation 
 TCP was not regulated as a contaminant by the federal government, but research shows that it could have severe health effects; only the state of California had significant regulation of this compound.

In a drinking water project  proposed by the United States Environmental Protection Agency (EPA), TCP was one of sixteen suspected human carcinogens being considered for regulation in 2011.

State regulation 
Pre-1980s, agricultural use of chloropropane-containing soil fumigants for use as pesticides and nematicides was prevalent in the United States. Some soil fumigants, which contained a mixture of primarily 1,3-dichloropropene and 1,2-dichloropropane, and in which 1,2,3-TCP was a minor component, e.g., trade name of D-D, were marketed for the cultivation of various crops including citrus fruits, pineapples, soy beans, cotton, tomatoes, and potatoes. D-D was first marketed in 1943, but is no longer available in the United States, and has been replaced with Telone II, which was first available in 1956. Telone II reportedly contains as much as 99 percent 1,3-dichloropropene and up to 0.17 percent by weight 1,2,3-TCP (Zebarth et al., 1998). Before 1978, approximately 55 million pounds/year of 1,3-dichloropropene were produced annually in the United States, and approximately 20 million pounds/year of 1,2-dichloropropane and 1,2,3-TCP were produced as by-products in the production of 1,3-dichloropropene. Over 2 million pounds of pesticides containing 1,3-dichloropropene were used in California alone in 1978. Telone II is still used for vegetables, field crops, fruit and nut trees, grapes, nursery crops, and cotton.

The California State Water Resources Control Board's Division of Drinking Water established an enforceable Maximum Contaminant Level (MCL) of 5 ng/L (parts per trillion).  The state of Alaska has promulgated standards establishing cleanup levels for 1,2,3-trichloropropane contamination in soils and groundwater.  The state of California considers 1,2,3-trichloropropane to be a regulated contaminant that must be monitored. The state of Colorado has also promulgated a groundwater standard although there is no drinking water standard. Although there is not much regulation on this substance, it has proved that TCP is a carcinogen in laboratory mice, and most likely a human carcinogen as well. On a federal scale, there is no MCL for this contaminant. The Permissible Exposure Limit (PEL) in occupational setting for air is 50 ppm or 300 mg/m. The concentration in air at which TCP becomes an Immediate Danger to Life and Health (IDLH) is at 100 ppm. These regulations were reviewed in 2009.

TCP as an emerging contaminant 
TCP does not contaminate soil. Instead, it leaks down into groundwater and settles at the bottom of the reservoir because TCP is more dense than water. This makes TCP in its pure form a DNAPL (Dense Nonaqueous Phase Liquid) and it is, therefore, harder to remove it from groundwater. There is no evidence that TCP can naturally decompose, but it might in favorable conditions. Groundwater remediation of TCP can occur through in situ chemical oxidation, permeable reactive barriers, and other remediation techniques. Several TCP remediation strategies have been studied and/or applied with varying degrees of success. These include extraction with granular activated carbon, in situ chemical oxidation, and in situ chemical reduction. Recent studies suggest that reduction with zerovalent metals, particularly zerovalent zinc, may be particularly effective in TCP remediation. Bioremediation may also be a promising clean-up technique.

References

External links 
 California Department of Public Health
 CDC – NIOSH Pocket Guide to Chemical Hazards

Chloroalkanes
Halogenated solvents
IARC Group 2A carcinogens